Enflurane (2-chloro-1,1,2-trifluoroethyl difluoromethyl ether) is a halogenated ether.  Developed by Ross Terrell in 1963, it was first used clinically in 1966. It was increasingly used for inhalational anesthesia during the 1970s and 1980s but is no longer in common use.

Enflurane is a structural isomer of isoflurane. It vaporizes readily, but is a liquid at room temperature.

Physical properties

Side effects
Clinically, enflurane produces a dose-related depression of myocardial contractility with an associated decrease in myocardial oxygen consumption. Between 2% and 5% of the inhaled dose is oxidised in the liver, producing fluoride ions and difluoromethoxy-difluoroacetic acid. This is significantly higher than the metabolism of its structural isomer isoflurane.

Enflurane also lowers the threshold for seizures, and should especially not be used on people with epilepsy.  Like all potent inhalation anaesthetic agents it is a known trigger of malignant hyperthermia.

Like the other potent inhalation agents it relaxes the uterus in pregnant women which is associated with more blood loss at delivery or other procedures on the gravid uterus.

The obsolete (as an anaesthetic) agent methoxyflurane had a nephrotoxic effect and caused acute kidney injury, usually attributed to the liberation of fluoride ions from its metabolism.  Enflurane is similarly metabolised but the liberation of fluoride results in a lower plasma level and enflurane related kidney failure seemed unusual if seen at all.

Pharmacology
The exact mechanism of the action of general anaesthetics has not been delineated.  Enflurane acts as a positive allosteric modulator of the GABAA, glycine, and 5-HT3 receptors, and as a negative allosteric modulator of the AMPA, kainate, and NMDA receptors, as well as of nicotinic acetylcholine receptors.

Occupational safety 
The U.S. National Institute for Occupational Safety and Health (NIOSH) has set a recommended exposure limit (REL) for exposure to waste anaesthetic gas of 2 ppm (15.1 mg/m3) over a 60-minute period. Symptoms of occupational exposure to enflurane include eye irritation, central nervous system depression, analgesia, anesthesia, convulsions, and respiratory depression.

References 

5-HT3 agonists
AMPA receptor antagonists
NMDA receptor antagonists
Kainate receptor antagonists
General anesthetics
Ethers
Organochlorides
Organofluorides
GABAA receptor positive allosteric modulators
Nicotinic antagonists
Glycine receptor agonists
Fluranes
Difluoromethoxy compounds